Maroga setiotricha is a moth in the family Xyloryctidae. It was described by Edward Meyrick in 1890. It is found in Australia, where it has been recorded from the Northern Territory, Queensland and Western Australia.

The wingspan is 56–66 mm. The forewings are grey whitish, strewn with numerous long fine linear blackish scales. There is a blackish dot in the disc at two-thirds. The hindwings are iridescent whitish in males. The hindwings of the females are fuscous, darker towards the base and with the apex paler.

The larvae feed on Acacia species. They bore in the stem of their host plant.

References

Maroga
Moths described in 1890